Captain Steve (March 1, 1997 – April 21, 2013) was an American Thoroughbred racehorse. He was bred by Roger Laubach, raised by Cecil "Buddy" Williams, owned by Michael E. Pegram, and trained by Bob Baffert.  A Chestnut foal by Fly So Free out of Sparkling Delite (by Vice Regent), he started 25 times, and earned $6,828,356.

Racing history
At age 2, Captain Steve won the 1999 Grade II Breeders' Futurity Stakes, the Grade I Hollywood Futurity, and the Grade II Kentucky Jockey Club Stakes.  He came in third in the Grade II Del Mar Futurity and the Grade III Best Pal Stakes.

At age 3, he won the 2000 Grade I Swaps Stakes, the Grade II Kentucky Cup Classic Handicap, and the Iowa Derby.  He placed in the Grade I Haskell Invitational Handicap and the Grade II Goodwood Handicap, and came in third in the Grade I Breeders' Cup Classic, the Grade I Santa Anita Derby, the Grade II Louisiana Derby, and the Grade II Santa Catalina Stakes.  Captain Steve finished eighth behind winner Fusaichi Pegasus in the 2000 Kentucky Derby.

At age 4, he won the Grade I Donn Handicap and the Group I Dubai World Cup.  (UAE)  He placed in the then-Grade II Stephen Foster Handicap, and showed in the Grade III San Diego Handicap.

From his 25 starts, he won 9, placed three times, and showed seven times.

Stud period
In 2001, he was sold to the Japan Racing Association for $5,000,000 to stand at Shizunai Stud for 1,800,000 Yen.

Origin of name
Captain Steve is named after Captain Steve Thompson, the head of the Louisville Police Department's criminal investigation division in 1997.  After attending the 1997 Kentucky Derby, owner Michael E. Pegram received a birthday present from his girlfriend.  He didn't unwrap the present, which contained a gun, prior to attempting to clear security at the Louisville International Airport the day after the Derby and  police arrested Pegram for possession of a .357 Magnum.  Pegram's best friend, trainer Bob Baffert, winner of the Kentucky Derby the previous day with Silver Charm, called the Louisville Police Department and spoke with Captain Thompson.  After listening to Baffert's story, Captain Thompson intervened with the presiding judge, drove to the police station and picked up Pegram.  When the 1997 chestnut son of Fly So Free came along, Pegram is reported as saying, "I want to name him Captain Steve, after my savior."

Death

Captain Steve died on April 21, 2013, at Schichinohe Stallion Station in northern Japan from acute heart failure.  He was 16.

Notes

References
Captain Steve's pedigree and photo
Racing writer Bill Nack on Captain Steve's name

1997 racehorse births
2013 racehorse deaths
Racehorses bred in Kentucky
Racehorses trained in the United States
Dubai World Cup winners
Thoroughbred family 20-a